Mark A. Matthews (September 24, 1867 – 1940) was a Presbyterian minister in Seattle, Washington, from 1902 until his death. He was a leading city reformer, who investigated red light districts and crime scenes, denouncing corrupt politicians businessmen and saloon keepers. With 10,000 members, his was the largest Presbyterian Church in the country, and he was selected the national moderator in 1912. He built a model church, with night schools, unemployment bureaus, kindergarten, an anti-tuberculosis clinic, and the nation's first church-owned radio station. Matthews was the most influential clergymen in the Pacific Northwest, and one of the most active Social Gospelers in America. He was an enigmatic figure, holding views in common with both Christian fundamentalists and liberals, especially the Social Gospel movement. He battled corruption (especially in the person of Seattle mayor Hiram Gill) and encouraged social services. There is a statue of him in Seattle's Denny Park.

In line with his Progressive leanings, Matthews was an advocate of the Temperance movement. In his writings, he extended the Temperance platform of abstinence from alcohol to include other vices and associated institutions. He is quoted as saying, "The saloon is the most fiendish, corrupt, hell-soaked institution that ever crawled out of the slime of the eternal pit. ... It takes your sweet innocent daughter, robs her of her virtue, and transforms her into a brazen, wanton harlot.... It is the open sore of this land". Unusually for a prohibitionist, Matthews opposed women's suffrage. He also supported limitations on the immigration of Asians.

Born in Calhoun, Georgia, in a family beset by post Civil War poverty, Matthews grew up in the environment of Southern revivalism and, later, post-Reconstruction radical agrarian politics. His religious education was largely informal, but by 1886, at the age of 19, he was a preacher, first in Georgia and later in Tennessee. In 1902, he moved to Seattle to become pastor of the First Presbyterian Church. He married Grace Jones in 1904; they were to have two children, Gwladys and Mark Jr. As pastor from 1902 to 1940, Matthews built his church into the country's largest Presbyterian church; at its height, it had 10,000 members. He helped create such institutions as Harborview Medical Center and the organization that began as the Seattle Day Nursery and is now Childhaven, an institution to treat child abuse. He established KTW Radio in 1922, the first church-owned radio station in the U.S. First Presbyterian also spun out branch churches, including University Presbyterian Church, which continues to be a major institution to this day.

See also

 Dr. Mark A. Matthews (1941), Denny Park, Seattle

Notes

Further reading
 Clark, Norman H.  The Dry Years: Prohibition & Social Change in Washington, Revised Edition, University of Washington, 1988. .
 Giboney, Ezra P.  and Agnes M. Potter. The Life of Mark A. Matthews. (Grand Rapids: William B. Eerdmans, 1948).
 Russell, C. Allyn. "Mark Allison Matthews: Seattle Fundamentalist and Civic Reformer." Journal of Presbyterian History  (1979): 446-466. in JSTOR
 Soden, Dale E.  The Reverend Mark Matthews: An Activist in the Progressive Era'''. (Seattle: University of Washington Press, 2001) .
 Soden, Dale. "Mark Allison Matthews: Seattle's Minister Rediscovered." Pacific Northwest Quarterly (1983): 50-58. 
 Soden, Dale E. "The Social Gospel in Tennessee: Mark Allison Matthews." Tennessee Historical Quarterly'' (1982): 159-170. in JSTOR

External links
 Pistol-Packing Parson: Mark Matthews and Protestant Culture in the Pacific Northwest
 Photographs including Mark A. Matthews from University of Washington Libraries Digital Collections

1867 births
1940 deaths
Presbyterian Church in the United States of America ministers
American temperance activists
People from Calhoun, Georgia
American anti-corruption activists
Anti-suffragists